Kathleen Gilje (born 1945) is an American art restorer and artist.  She is best known for her appropriations of Old Master Paintings which combine their historical provenance with contemporary ideas and perspective.

Early life and education
Gilje was born in Bay Ridge, Brooklyn. She received her BFA from the City College of New York and trained as a conservator from 1967 to 1971 at the Museo di Capodimonte in Naples, Italy. Gilje apprenticed in Rome with the restorer of antique paintings, Antonio deMata, from 1966 to 1968. Gilje continued her apprenticeship from 1968 to 1972 at the Museum of Capodimonte in Naples.

Career

Restoration 
In 1973, she returned to New York and worked in the conservation studio of Marco Grassi,  where she restored Old Master paintings for private and museum clients, including Stanley Moss, E.V. Thaw, Robert Dance, the Metropolitan Museum of Art in New York, the Norton Simon Collection in Pasadena, and the Thyssen Bornemizsa Collection. In 1976, she opened her own studio.  During this period, she also created artistic works, initially relief sculpture and then painting which was exhibited in various SoHo galleries. Gilje began to combine her knowledge of conservation with her own paintings in the early 1990s.

Revised and Restored 
La Donna Velata

In 1995, Kathleen Gilje created La Donna Velata, Restored oil on canvas. The painting formed from Raphael's La Donna Veleta (1516) is one of three portraits of his lifelong Roman mistress Margarita Luti. Contrary to Raphael's painting which captivates its well-balanced composition, through the opulent white and gold gown, and sheer veil framing the woman's face, Gilje's version is staggeringly different by adding a black eye to the woman's gentle face as a bold representation of the timelessness of gender, power, and, violence against women. Gilje explains with La Donna Velata, Restored she was moved by a story from her daughter telling her how a classmate was killed by her father and then later a book which showed a picture of the victim. Most of the time when she addresses important issues in her art they are individual incidents. Each of the pieces Gilje creates is prompted by an individual story, not an agenda.

Alternative readings 
In her paintings, drawings and installations, Gilje applies an art historical analysis and uses methodologies of conservation to create altered versions of familiar paintings which suggest alternative interpretations of the original artworks. In this way, she encourages her audience to think about a work of art on several levels: its material and historical narrative. An example of this is Rembrandt's Danaë defaced by a vandal with acid in the Hermitage, its contemporary symbolism translated into up-to-date equivalents; another is Caravaggio's Boy Bitten by a Lizard, Restored, 1992, where the lizard is replaced by a syringe, suggesting a link to the risk of AIDS.

Many of her paintings engage with feminist issues, although they are sometimes controversial (as in her series of "Sargent's Women," portraying 48 women visually excised from paintings by John Singer Sargent, all rendered without their luxurious clothing). In Susanna and the Elders, Restored, 1998, Gilje exhibits a recreation of Artemisia Gentileschi's Susanna and the Elders (a story of sexual abuse) hanging next to an x-ray of the painting. When Gilje recreated Gentileschi's painting, she made an underpainting in lead white (lead white x-rays well) of Gentileschi's own rape by Agostino Tassi. In the x-ray we see Gentileschi's arm extended holding a knife in self-defense and her face contorted and screaming. The image can faintly be seen in the pentimento as well. Her references are provocative as she addresses timely social, political and personal concerns.

Portraits 
Gilje created a number of portraits in which her subjects were placed in the context of an historic painting of their choice; these were displayed in her exhibition Curators and Connoisseur at Francis M. Naumann Fine Art, New York, in 2006. For example, art historian Linda Nochlin chose Édouard Manet's 1882 Bar at the Folies Bergère for Gilje's Linda Nochlin at the Bar at the Folies Bergere, 2006, and art historian Robert Rosenblum chose Ingres’ 1823/26 Comte de Pastoret for his Gilje portrait of 2005.

Exhibitions and recognition

Over the course of the past twenty years, her work has been shown in various exhibitions throughout the United States and in Europe. Several critics and art historians have written about her work, including Robert Rosenblum, Linda Nochlin and John Yau.

Gilje's work is in the collection of several museums, including the Weatherspoon Museum, University of North Carolina, Greensboro, North Carolina, National Museum of Women in the Arts, Washington, D.C., Yale University Art Gallery, New Haven, Connecticut, The National Portrait Gallery, Smithsonian Institution, Washington, D.C., Musée Ingres, Louvre Museum, Montauban, France, Bass Museum, Miami, Florida, the Williams College Museum of Art, Williamstown, Addison Gallery of American Art and Phillips Academy, Andover, Massachusetts.

References

Lilly Wei. Review, ARTnews, November 2013.  
Martha Schwendener,  “Masterpieces, Revised by a Playful Restorer,” New York Times, NY/Region, 6/30/2013.  
Peter Sutton et al., Revised and Restored: The Art of Kathleen Gilje, (Greenwich, CT: Bruce Museum, 2013).  
Women Artists: The Linda Nochlin Reader, edited by Maura Reilley (New York: Thames & Hudson, 2015).   
Dimitri Salmon, "Qui Sont Les Ingristes d’Aujourd’hui?," Grande Galerie: Le Journal du Louvre, June 2009.
Molly Birnbaum, "Sargent Takeoffs Take Ie," ARTnews, June 2009.
Linda Nochlin, “Seeing Beneath the Surface,” Art in America (March 2002): pp. 119–121.
Mieke Bal, “Traumkunst, Musicians, Restored,” Kulturanalyse (Frankfurt am Main: Suhrkamp Taschenbuch Verlag 2002: pp 198–200. 
Stanley Fish, “Postmodern Warfare,” Harper’s Magazine (illustration by K. Gilje), July 2002, p. 90. 
Wendy Steiner, “Lost in Amazonia,” The Nation, May 15, 2000. (found online 3/1/2015)          
Michael Kimmelman, “Kathleen Gilje at Bravin Post Lee," The New York Times, September 13, 1996.    
Gerald Silk, “Reframes and Refrains: Artists Rethink Art History,” Art Journal, Fall 1995, pp 10–19.
Haden-Guest, Anthony, "Judging Yourself," Financial Times, New York, April 16, 2006.
Salmon, Dimitri, "Qui sont les Ingristes d'jourd'hui," Le Journal du Louvre, June 2009.

External links
Kathleen Gilje website: http://www.kathleengilje.com 
Susanna and the Elders, Restored, 1998, Oil on canvas, 67” x 47” YouTube.
Kathleen Gilje: 48 Portraits: Sargent's Women, Restored (New York: Francis Naumann Fine Art (February 26 – April 10, 2009).
Revised and Restored: The Art of Kathleen Gilje. Bruce Museum, Greenwich, CT (May 11 – September 8, 2013). YouTube.
Kathleen Gilje: Portraits of Paintings, Flint Institute of Arts, 1120 East Kearsley Street, Flint, MI (May 3 – July 20, 2014).

1945 births
People from Bay Ridge, Brooklyn
City College of New York alumni
20th-century American painters
American women artists
Living people
Radiographers
21st-century American painters
20th-century American women
21st-century American women